Harry Thayer may refer to:

 Harry Bates Thayer (1858–1936), businessman
 Harry E. T. Thayer (1927–2017), diplomat
 Harry Irving Thayer (1869–1926), Congressman from Massachusetts
 Harry Thayer (American football, born 1873) (1873–1936), All-American football player
 Harry Thayer (American football executive) (1907–1980), American football executive

See also 
 Thayer (disambiguation)